Affective memory was an early element of Stanislavski's 'system' and a central part of method acting. Affective memory requires actors to call on the memory of details from a similar situation (or more recently a situation with similar emotions) and import those feelings  to those of their characters. Stanislavski believed actors needed to take emotion and personality to the stage and call upon it when playing their character. He also explored the use of objectives, actioning, and empathizing with the character.

"Emotional recall" is the basis for Stanislavski's Method acting. "Sense memory" is used to refer to the recall of physical sensations surrounding emotional events (instead of the emotions themselves) through a structured process based on a series of exercises. The use of affective memory remains a controversial topic in acting theory. Otherwise known as emotional memory, it is often used by making the actors completely relax so that they recall the memory better.

See also
 Presentational acting and representational acting
 Emotion and memory

References 

Acting techniques